Usha Naidu is the spouse of Venkaiah Naidu. She served as the 13th Second lady of India.

Personal life 
She married Venkaiah Naidu in 14 April 1970 and has one son and daughter.

References 

Year of birth missing (living people)
Living people